Dautmergen is a municipality in the Zollernalbkreis district of Baden-Württemberg, Germany.

History
Dautmergen was a possession of the County of Hohenberg until 1381, when it became part of the Duchy of Austria's territory in Swabia. The town was given to the Kingdom of Württemberg in 1805 during the process of German mediatization. The town was assigned to  when that district was organized in 1806. A subcamp of the Natzweiler-Struthof concentration camp was constructed at Dautmergen during the Second World War. After the war, Dautmergen developed into a commuter town and expanded to the north.

Geography
The valley marks the lowest elevation above sea level in the municipal area at  Normalnull (NN). The highest elevation,  NN, is found to the southwest of Dautmergen itself.

Coat of arms
Dautmergen's coat of arms is divided into thirds, with a white chief, red fess, and yellow field, which contains a lion rendered in black with red claws. The tincture and pattern of the coat of arms reference the historical owners of Dautmergen: the red-white blazon are for the County of Hohenberg and for Austria and the yellow field and lion are for Württemberg. This pattern was first approved by the Post-war provisional Württemberg-Hohenzollern government on 11 January 1949, and then by the Zollernalb district office on 7 December 1987.

Transportation
Dautmergen is connected to the German system of highways by Bundesstraße 27.

References

External links

  (in German)

Municipalities in Baden-Württemberg
Württemberg